Lee Jong-Won (born 14 March 1989) is a South Korean football player who plays for Suwon FC as a midfielder.

Club career 
Choo joined Busan I'Park as a draft pick from Sungkyunkwan University for the 2011 K-League season. Lee made his first start for Busan against Gangwon FC in the fourth round of the 2011 K-League Cup, playing the full 90 minutes. In the following round of the Cup, against the Chunnam Dragons, Lee scored the only goal of the match which ensured a win for Busan. His K-League debut was on 15 May 2011, as a late substitute in a match against Incheon United.

Club career statistics
As of 4 December 2013

References

External links

1989 births
Living people
Association football midfielders
South Korean footballers
Busan IPark players
Seongnam FC players
Gimcheon Sangmu FC players
Suwon FC players
K League 1 players
K League 2 players
Sungkyunkwan University alumni